Gerald Mark Diduck (born April 6, 1965) is a Canadian former professional ice hockey defenceman. He was drafted in the first round, 16th overall, by the Islanders in the 1983 NHL Entry Draft. Diduck played 932 games in an NHL career that spanned eight different teams from 1984 to 2001. He played for the New York Islanders, Montreal Canadiens, Vancouver Canucks, Chicago Blackhawks, Hartford Whalers, Phoenix Coyotes, Toronto Maple Leafs and Dallas Stars.  He is part of hockey lore as the man who ended the career of Islanders legend and teammate Bob Nystrom with an accidental high stick that almost cost Nystrom his eye. Diduck was born in Edmonton, Alberta and now resides in Texas. He is the brother-in-law of professional musician and CKY bassist Matt Deis. Diduck is of Ukrainian ancestry.

Career statistics

Regular season and playoffs

International

References

External links

1965 births
Canadian ice hockey defencemen
Canadian people of Ukrainian descent
Chicago Blackhawks players
Dallas Stars players
Hartford Whalers players
Lethbridge Broncos players
Living people
Montreal Canadiens players
National Hockey League first-round draft picks
New York Islanders draft picks
New York Islanders players
Phoenix Coyotes players
Ice hockey people from Edmonton
Springfield Indians players
Toronto Maple Leafs players
Vancouver Canucks players